Home Insurance Plaza is a  tall skyscraper at 59 Maiden Lane in the Financial District of Manhattan, New York City. It was completed in 1966 and has 44 floors. Alfred Easton Poor designed the structure, while the plaza was redeveloped in 1987 by Kohn Pedersen Fox.

The plaza is the home of Liberty, a  mural by Julie Harvey. Simple in its concept, it illustrates that New York's present was built upon the foundations its forefathers placed many years ago. The Statue of Liberty is reflected in the mirrored facade of a skyscraper. Early 19th century New York emerges revealing the cobblestone streets, horses and carriages, gentlemen with top hats, and ships in the seaport. Harvey has also included the old shipping barrels, lamp posts and even pigs that ran freely around Lower Manhattan. The Liberty mural was presented to the community as a visual expression of the foundations on which New York was established.

Tenants
New York State Comptroller
AmTrust

See also
List of tallest buildings in New York City

References

External links
 
in-Arch.net: The Home Insurance Company Building
in-Julie Harvey Public Art

Financial District, Manhattan
Office buildings completed in 1966
Skyscraper office buildings in Manhattan